David George may refer to:
David George (Baptist) (1740/42–1810), African American Baptist preacher, and a founding father of Sierra Leone
David George (cyclist) (born 1976), South African cyclist
David George (Manitoba politician)
David R. George III, American science fiction writer
A pseudonym of Leo Dorfman

See also
 David Lloyd George (1863–1945), surname Lloyd George, British politician, Prime Minister of the United Kingdom
 David Gorge (1501–1556), aka Jan Jorisz, Protestant reformer
 George David (disambiguation)